The Utica Depot was built by the Chicago, Milwaukee and St. Paul Railway ("Milwaukee Road") in the 1890s. It is a rectangular one story structure with wide overhanging bracketed eaves. It is a standardized depot design constructed by railroads in many rural locations. The depot has belled siding and an irregular stone foundation; a bay window and the main door are located on the front façade.

The depot was listed in the National Register of Historic Places because of its architecture and also because of its association with the development of Utica and Yankton County. Since closing, the depot was moved from Utica to a museum in Menno.

References

Railway stations on the National Register of Historic Places in South Dakota
Utica, South Dakota
Transportation in Yankton County, South Dakota
National Register of Historic Places in Yankton County, South Dakota
Former railway stations in South Dakota